Sangam is a village and a pilgrimage site in Vangara mandal in Srikakulam district in the state of Andhra Pradesh, India.
Sangam is a village and a pilgrimage site in Vangara mandal in Srikakulam district in the state of Andhra Pradesh, India.

It is about 56 kilometers from Srikakulam Town and 20 kilometers from Rajam.

Religious Importance
Nagavali, Suvarnamukhi and Vegavati rivers confluence (join together) takes place here and hence it is referred as Triveni Sangam.

The idol of Lord Sangameswara, another name for Lord Shiva, was here installed (vigraha pratista) by Balaram, the brother of Lord SriKrishna. This is one of the five 'Linga Kshetras'. Thousands of devotees gather here on Maha Shivaratri festival every year.

References

Hindu pilgrimage sites in India
Villages in Srikakulam district
Villages in Vangara mandal